This list of mountains and hills of the Westerwald contains a selection of the mountains, hills and high points of the Westerwald range which lies in the German states of Hesse, North Rhine-Westphalia and Rhineland-Palatinate. The Westerwald is, in turn, part of the Rhenish Massif and includes some or all of the nature parks of Bergisches Land, Nassau, Rhine-Westerwald and Siebengebirge.

See also these lists: Mountains and hills of the Rhenish Massif / Mountains and hills of Hesse / Mountains and hills of North Rhine-Westphalia / Mountains and hills of Rhineland-Palatinate

The table is arranged in order of height in metres (m) above Normalhöhennull (NHN; unless otherwise stated ). By clicking on the symbols at the head of each column, it can be resorted . In the column "Mountain or hill", alternative names are given in brackets, italics and small lettering. In this column, where there are two or more mountains or hills with the same name they are distinguished by their location in brackets and small lettering.

The abbreviations used in the table are explained below.

Abbreviations 
The abbreviations used in the table (in alphabetical order) mean:

Districts or counties:
 AK = Altenkirchen (district)
 EMS = Rhein-Lahn-Kreis
 LDK = Lahn-Dill-Kreis
 LM = Limburg-Weilburg
 NR = Neuwied (district)
 SI = Siegen-Wittgenstein
 SU = Rhein-Sieg-Kreis
 WW = Westerwaldkreis

Federal states:
 HE = Hesse
 NW = North Rhine-Westphalia
 RP = Rhineland-Palatinate

Features:
 AT = Viewing tower
 Ex = former
 km² = square kilometres
 ND = natural monument
 NP = Nature Park
 NSG = Naturschutzgebiet (here: given with area and year designated)
 S = river source
 Mil trg area = Military training area

Footnotes and references 

Westerwald
!Westerwald
!Westerwald
!Westerwald